The 1820 Louisiana gubernatorial election was the third gubernatorial election to take place after Louisiana achieved statehood. Under Article III Sec 2 of the 1812 Constitution of the State of Louisiana the Governor was elected in two steps. On the first Monday in July, eligible voters went to the polls and voted. The returns were sent to the President of the Louisiana State Senate. On the second day of the session of the Louisiana State Legislature, the Louisiana House of Representatives and Senate met in joint session and voted between the top two candidates. The candidate who received a majority in General Assembly became governor.

Results
Popular Vote

General Assembly Vote

References

1820
Gubernatorial
Louisiana
July 1820 events